Machnes is a surname. Notable people with the surname include:

Arie Machnes (born 1921), Israeli footballer
Gad Machnes (footballer) (born 1956), Israeli footballer and manager
Gad Machnes (politician) (1893–1954), Israeli politician
Oded Machnes (born 1956), Israeli footballer and manager

Hebrew-language surnames